The Guerrilla Bish (stylized as THE GUERRiLLA BiSH) is the fourth album by Japanese idol group Bish released through Avex Trax on November 26, 2017. A simple CD version of the album was surprise released exclusive to Tower Records for two days from November 4~5, priced at 299 yen. The album was also digitally released through iTunes for one day on November 6 for 300 yen. The album was preceded by the single "Promise The Star", released on March 22, 2017, and the EP "GiANT KiLLERS", released on June 28, 2017. The music video for the track "My landscape" was posted on YouTube on November 4, followed by the music video for "SMACK baby SMACK" on November 30.

Track listing

Personnel
BiSH
Cent Chihiro Chittiii – vocals
Aina the End – vocals; lyrics on Track 11
Momoko Gumi Company – vocals; lyrics on Tracks 2, 7 and 10
Lingling – vocals; lyrics on Track 8
Hashiyasume Atsuko – vocals; lyrics on Track 12
Ayuni D – vocals; lyrics on Track 5

Notes
All writing, arrangement and personnel credits taken from the album insert and from track previews posted on Twitter.

References

2017 albums
BiSH albums